The Moravica District is one of eight administrative districts of Šumadija and Western Serbia. It is located in the central and south-western parts of Serbia. The name Moravica derives from the river Moravica, which forms the West Morava, both passing through the district. As of 2022 census, the district has a population of 190,554 inhabitants. The administrative center of the Moravica district is the city of Čačak.

Municipalities
The district encompasses of the 3 municipalities and the city of Čačak:
 Gornji Milanovac
 Lučani
 Ivanjica

Demographics

According to the official census done in 2011, the Moravica District had 212,603 inhabitants. 53.8% of the population lived in the urban areas. As of 2022 census, the district has a population of 190,554 inhabitants.

Ethnic groups
Ethnic composition of the Moravica district:

Culture
In the monuments heritage of Čačak a special place is taken by the religious building: monasteries and churches. The ten monasteries of the Ovčarsko-Kablarska Gorge are referred to as the Serbian Athos. Certain were built in the time of the Serb gentry of the Nemanjić, Lazarević and Branković dynasties. Over centuries, these ten monasteries safeguarded ancient manuscripts, and some were also written or copied there.

Education
There are two faculties of the University of Kragujevac located in the Moravica District:
 Faculty of Agronomy
 Faculty of Technical Sciences

Economy
Čačak, the largest city in the district, is one of the major economic centers of Serbia. Its economy is dominated by industrial production, above all, by metal-processing, paper production and chemical industry.

The employment rate in the Moravica District is among highest in the country. As of 31 December 2020, a total of 64,879 people were employed and 10,594 people (14.04%) were unemployed among active people. By ratio of unemployment per capita, Ivanjica had the highest and Gornji Milanovac the lowest ratio.

See also
 Administrative divisions of Serbia
 Districts of Serbia

References

Note: All official material made by Government of Serbia is public by law.

External links

 

 
Districts of Šumadija and Western Serbia